Bhai Manvir Singh Chaheru (1959 – December 1987; also known as "Bhai Manbir Singh Chaheru", Iqbal Singh, Hari Singh and "General Manvir Singh Chaheru",) was a founder and first leader of the organization Khalistan Commando Force.

Early life

Manvir Singh was born in 1959 in the village of Chaheru, Jalandhar, Punjab.
His father, Mohinder Singh, was a farmer.

Manvir Singh completed his primary education from his village school.
He then moved to the home of his maternal aunt Niranjan Kaur, in the village of Kala Bakra, for his secondary education.
After passing his matriculation exams, he assisted his father in agriculture for six years.
He later married Ranjit Kaur.

Baptism and religious inclination

The Nirankari-Sikh events of 1978 affected Manvir Singh. A retired army officer Giani Joginder Singh who was also son-in-law of Manvir Singh's aunt Niranjan Kaur, encouraged him to get baptised (a Sikh initiation ceremony). In 1979, Manvir Singh along with his wife and his father's younger brother, Karnail Singh, took the baptism from Sant Nihal Singh Harian Wela Wale at the Sodal Gurdwara in district of Jalandhar, Punjab.

He came in contact with Bhai Mohkam Singh, Bhai Gurbant Singh, Bhai Prem Singh and Jarnail Singh Bhindranwale while attending religious classes of Damdami Taksal at the Gurdwara Gurdarshan Parkash, Mehta Chownk, district Amritsar, Punjab.

Association with Jarnail Singh Bhindranwale

In 1981, Chaheru was arrested temporarily because of his heated arguments with a Senior Superintendent of Police of Jalandhar, Gur Iqbal Singh Bhular, when Bhular questioned Chaheru about his actions.
Chaheru's uncle, Karnail Singh, got him released on bail with a personal surety that Manvir Singh would appear at Police station the next day.
After this incident, Manvir Singh approached Jarnail Singh Bhindranwale and moved to the Golden Temple (Harmandir Sahib) complex where he served food in the Sikh free kitchen (Guru ka Langar).
Chaheru became Bhindranwale's personal bodyguard.
Police arrested his uncle Karnail Singh for Manvir Singh's failure to appear at the police station per his assurance.

In the Golden Temple complex, Manvir Singh stayed in room number 53 of Guru Nanak Niwas along with Giani Joginder Singh, Malagar Singh Babbar, Singh and Gurtej Singh.
He came in contact with Major Singh Nagoke who fought against Indian forces during Operation Blue Star, Sukhdev Singh Sukha of village Fatu Dinga, Balwinder Singh Khojkipur, Joginder Singh Rode and Kabal Singh.

Giani Joginder Singh, a relative of Manvir Singh Chaheru, died while leading a band of Sikhs in fighting Indian army at the main entrance of Golden Temple during Operation Bluestar.
Giani Joginder Singh's daughter later married Jarnail Singh Bhindranwale's son Inderjit Singh.

Khalistan Commando Force
Manvir Singh Chaheru was not inside Sri Harmandir Sahib (The Golden Temple) during Operation Blue Star in 1984.
After the attack, he fled to Pakistan, but returned to avenge the attack and to achieve independence for Khalistan.
He and others, including Harjinder Singh Jinda, Sukhdev Singh Sukha, Gurdev Singh Debu, Mathra Singh and Tarsem Singh Kuhaar, established the Khalistan Commando Force and Manvir Singh Chaheru was declared its leader.

Manvir Singh set up the KCF military hierarchy, but ad hoc groups conducted most operations at the local level.

He participated in several encounters against Indian security forces.

In 1986 Manvir Singh and Balbir Singh Raipur planned to release Sukhdev Singh Sukha and Sawarnjit Singh from Police custody as they were to appear in court on charges of slaying Ramesh Chander, a Hindu newspaper editor.

Balbir Singh arranged a car and Jarnail Singh arranged a jeep as a get away vehicle.
They planned to free both Sukhdev Singh and Sawarnjit Singh from the district courts in Jalandhar, Punjab, India when the prisoners arrived for their monthly hearings.
Manvir Singh, Ajitpal Singh, Balbir Singh Raipur, Rashpal Singh, Jarnail Singh met outside the courts.
Manvir Singh was carrying a sten gun and all other Singh's had revolvers.
When Sukhdev Singh and Sawarnjit Singh arrived under heavy police protection, Manvir Singh signalled them to go to the washrooms.
Once they went, Manvir Singh and his partners opened fire on the policemen, the attackers killed four police officers inside the court complex and two at the courtyard gate.
They were able to free Sukhdev Singh Sukha, Sawarnjit Singh and Gurinder Singh Bhola.

Arrest and death
On 8 August 1986, Manvir Singh Chaheru was arrested along with Major Baldev Singh Ghuman, Charanjit Singh dhami and two other Sikhs when approximately 200 paramilitary troops raided Major Baldev Singh's farm House on bootan village the outskirts of city of Jalandhar, in state of Punjab. Punjab police stated that there were two dozen murder cases registered against Chaheru by that time.

It is unclear as to what led to his arrest. It is possible that government infiltrators whose aim was to plot the Gurjit Singh faction against Kahlon faction did this. Subsequently the committee members of Kahlon faction were killed by the Gurjit Singh faction.

Bhai Manvir Singh Chaheru was kept in various jails in state of Punjab, and later he was moved to another jail in the state of Bihar.
In December 1987, police announced that Manvir Singh had escaped from the police custody while officials were returning Chaheru from Bihar to Punjab.
There were claims that police had killed him while he was in police custody and disposed his body in the Beas River.
In the city of Chandigarh, the Punjab Police Chief Julio Francis Ribeiro told news reporters afterward that "...they do not need to worry as Manvir Singh will not come back."

See also
Khalistan movement

References

External links

1959 births
People from Kapurthala
Indian Sikhs
Khalistan movement people
Indian murder victims
People murdered in India
Deaths in police custody in India
Punjabi people
Sikh terrorism
Insurgency in Punjab
1986 murders in India
1987 murders in India
1987 deaths